Ski jumping at the 2003 Winter Asian Games took place in the Takinosawa Ski Jumping Hill located in the town of Owani, Aomori Prefecture, Japan with two events contested — both men's. This was the first time ski jumping was officially added as a medal sport after being included in previous Winter Asiad programs only as a demonstration sport.

Schedule

Medalists

Medal table

Participating nations
A total of 14 athletes from 4 nations competed in ski jumping at the 2003 Asian Winter Games:

References
Results of the Fifth Winter Asian Games

External links
FIS website

 
2003 Asian Winter Games events
2003
Asian Winter Games